The Polish Cavalry Monument, also known as the Millennium Polish Cavalry Monument, is a statue located at the Polish Cavalry Roundabout (Rondo Jazdy Polskiej) in Warsaw.

History

The initiative to build the monument commemorating the Polish cavalry started in 1978, and in 1981 a committee was formed to organize the construction of the monument. The monument had to stand on a slope of the Łazienkowska Thoroughfare (Trasa Łazienkowska) at the entrance to Jazdów Street, where the cornerstone was laid in 1983.

In 1984, there was a design competition for the monument and from 13 entries, the design by sculptor and designer Mieczysław Naruszewicz was chosen. The statue was cast in 1987 at the Warsaw cooperative, Brąz Dekoracyjny.

Due to unstable geological conditions, it was decided to change the monument's location. As a consequence it is now set too high on its column with its back to pedestrians and traffic.

The monument was unveiled on 3 May 1994. The sculpture shows two distinct riders galloping on horseback: a Piast knight armed with a lance in his hand ready to strike, along with a sword and shield, and a Uhlan soldier armed with a saber in his outstretched hand, which symbolizes the beginning and the end of the Polish horse cavalry. To create the sculptures, Colonel Zbigniew Starak, a participant in the charge at the Battle of Schoenfeld (the last cavalry charge and mounted battle fought by the Polish cavalry), posed for the sculptor.

The lower part of the column is surrounded by four cast brass plaques with a list of 43 of the most important battles in the history of the Polish cavalry. Metal from army artillery shells was used in the creation of the plaques. These were designed by sculptor Mark Moderau. After 11 years, errors in the inscriptions were noted and corrected for the dates of the Obertyn, Orsza and Beresteczko battles.

In 2016, an initiative was taken to rotate the monument to turn it towards the roundabout and the Politechnika metro station (from the south to the north-east, a turn of 135 degrees). The rotation of the sculpture was scheduled for the fourth quarter of 2018 and was successfully completed on November 20 - 21.

Battles noted on the monument plaques

 Cedynia 972
 Psie Pole 1109
 Legnica 1241
 Płowce 1331
 Grunwald 1410
 Obertyn 1531
 Orsza 1564
 Byczyna 1588
 Kircholm 1605
 Kłuszyn 1610
 Trzciana 1629
 Beresteczko 1651
 Warka 1656
 Alsen 1658
 Podhajce 1667
 Chocim 1673
 Wiedeń 1683
 Parkany 1683
 Zieleńce 1792
 Samosierra 1808
 Lipsk 1813
 Stoczek 1831
 Grochów 1831
 Walewice 1863
 Rokitna 1915
 Krechowce 1917
 Jazłowiec 1919
 Koziatyn 1920
 Komarów 1920
 Korosteń 1920
 Krojanty 1939
 Mokra 1939
 Bzura 1939
 Wólka Węglowa 1939
 Kock 1939
 Montbard 1940
 Tobruk 1941
 Monte Cassino 1944
 Falaise 1944
 Moerdijk 1944
 Ancona 1944
 Bolonia 1945
 Borujsko 1945
 1000 years of the Polish Cavalry

Gallery

Bibliography

 Irena Grzesiuk-Olszewska: Warszawska rzeźba pomnikowa. Wydawnictwo Neriton, Warszawa 2003, s. 183-184. .

Monuments and memorials in Warsaw
1994 establishments in Poland
1994 sculptures
Polish cavalry
Military memorials and cemeteries in Poland